The 1910 Dublin Harbour by-election was held on 14 June 1910.  The by-election was held due to the death of the incumbent Irish Parliamentary MP, Timothy Harrington.  It was won by the Irish Parliamentary candidate William Abraham, who was returned unopposed.

References

1910 elections in the United Kingdom
By-elections to the Parliament of the United Kingdom in Dublin (city) constituencies
Unopposed by-elections to the Parliament of the United Kingdom (need citation)
1910 elections in Ireland